Gamma Trianguli Australis, Latinized from γ Trianguli Australis, is a single, white-hued star in the southern constellation of Triangulum Australe. Along with Alpha and Beta Trianguli Australis it forms a prominent triangular asterism that gives the constellation its name (Latin for southern triangle). It is the third-brightest member of this constellation with an apparent visual magnitude of +2.87.

The spectrum of this star matches a stellar classification of A1 V, which identifies it as an A-type main sequence star that is generating energy through the nuclear fusion of hydrogen at its core. An unusual abundance of the element europium demonstrates it to be a peculiar, or Ap star. Most stars of this type are slow rotators, but Gamma Trianguli Australis displays a very high rate of rotation with a projected rotational velocity of 199 km s−1. It has an estimated age of 260 million years.

This system shows an excess emission of infrared radiation, suggesting that there is a circumstellar disk of dust orbiting this star. The mean temperature of the emission is 50 K, corresponding to a separation from the star of 481 astronomical units.

Modern legacy
γ TrA appears on the  flag of Brazil, symbolising the state of Paraná.

References

A-type main-sequence stars
Ap stars
Suspected variables
Circumstellar disks

Triangulum Australe
Trianguli Australis, Gamma
Durchmusterung objects
135382
074946
5671